Gabor or Gábor is a Hungarian surname.

People so named include:
 B. B. Gabor, stage name of Gabor Hegedus (1948–1990), Hungary-born Canadian pop singer
 Bethlen Gábor, Hungarian spelling of Gabriel Bethlen (1580–1629), King of Hungary, Prince of Transylvania and a leader of an anti-Habsburg insurrection in Royal Hungary
 Bill Gabor (1922–2019), American basketball player
 Dennis Gabor (1900–1979), Hungarian-born British physicist and electrical engineer, Nobel Prize winner for inventing holography
 Eva Gabor (1919–1995), Hungarian-born American actress, sister of Magda and Zsa Zsa
 Jolie Gabor (1896–1997), Hungarian-American entrepreneur, jeweler and memoirist, mother of Eva, Magda and Zsa Zsa Gabor
 Magda Gabor (1915–1997), Hungarian entertainer, sister of Eva and Zsa Zsa
 Sasha Gabor (or Sárközy Gábor) (1945–2008), Hungarian-Norwegian (porn) actor and director
 Tamás Gábor (1932–2007), Hungarian Olympic champion épée fencer
 Viki Gabor (2007-), Polish singer and winner of the 2019 Junior Eurovision Song Contest.
 Zsa Zsa Gabor (1917–2016), Hungarian-American actress, sister of Eva and Magda

Hungarian-language surnames
Jewish surnames
Surnames from given names